Stephanie Casey (born August 1, 1983) is an American race walker and Family Medicine Doctor. Casey represented Team USA at World Athletics Championships, Pan American Games, World Athletics Race Walking Team Championships and North American, Central American and Caribbean Championships in athletics (race walk).

Life and career
Dr Stephanie Casey is a mother of 4 and wife.

Competition record

References

External links

 
 
 
 Competitive race walker hopes for strides toward gender equality in track and field by Lauren Negrete (KCBY11) Monday, April 29th 2019 Harrier Track Club

1983 births
Living people
American female racewalkers
People from Reedsport, Oregon
Sportspeople from Portland, Oregon
Sportspeople from Salem, Oregon
World Athletics Championships athletes for the United States
Pan American Games track and field athletes for the United States
21st-century American women
20th-century American women